The United People's Progressive Party (Obedinena narodno-progresivna partiya, ONPP) was a political party in Bulgaria.

History
The party was formed by a merger of the People's Party and the Progressive Liberal Party in 1920, with People's Party leader Ivan Evstratiev Geshov elected as the new party's first leader. The ONPP joined the Constitutional Bloc alliance for the April 1923 elections, which won 17 seats.

Following the June 1923 coup, the party joined the Democratic Alliance, which went on to win elections in November 1923.

The ONPP contested the 1927 elections alone, but received only 1.5% of the vote and failed to win a seat. In the 1931 elections its vote share fell to 0.6% and the party remained without a seat.

References

Defunct political parties in Bulgaria
Political parties established in 1920
Formerly banned political parties
1920 establishments in Bulgaria